Alexis Francisco Flores (born 11 January 2002) is an Argentine professional footballer who plays as a centre-back for San Lorenzo.

Club career
Flores concurrently played for three clubs, including Club de Olivos, before joining San Lorenzo at the end of 2014. He was promoted into the first-team in 2020, when manager Diego Monarriz selected him to start and finish a Torneos de Verano friendly with Talleres on 11 January. He was subsequently on the bench for two competitive fixtures in March under caretaker managers Leandro Romagnoli and Hugo Tocalli. It was, after six further matches as an unused sub, under Mariano Soso that Flores would make his debut, as he replaced Alexis Sabella during a Copa de la Liga Profesional win away to Atlético Tucumán on 29 December.

International career
Flores represented Argentina at various youth levels. He was a part of the squad that won the 2017 South American U-15 Championship, with the centre-back scoring a goal during a draw with Chile on 11 November. Two years later, Flores made seven appearances as they won the 2019 South American U-17 Championship in Peru. At the subsequent FIFA U-17 World Cup, Flores scored a goal against Cameroon. He also featured at numerous friendly tournaments at youth level, as well as appearing in U17 friendlies with the United States and, scoring against, New Zealand. In December 2020, Flores received a call-up from the U20s.

Style of play
Flores is primarily a centre-back, though did start out his youth career as a central midfielder.

Career statistics
.

Honours
Argentina U15
South American U-15 Championship: 2017

Argentina U17
South American U-17 Championship: 2019

Notes

References

External links

2002 births
Living people
People from Vicente López Partido
Argentine footballers
Argentina youth international footballers
Argentina under-20 international footballers
Association football defenders
Argentine Primera División players
San Lorenzo de Almagro footballers
Sportspeople from Buenos Aires Province